In US railroad terminology, a gondola is an open-topped rail vehicle used for transporting loose bulk materials. Because of their low side walls, gondolas are also suitable for the carriage of such high-density cargos as steel plates or coils, or of bulky items such as prefabricated sections of rail track. Gondolas are distinct from hopper cars in that they do not have doors on their floor to empty cargo.

In Australia these wagons are called open wagons.

History
The first gondola cars in North America were developed in the 1830s, and used primarily to carry coal. These cars were not widely used at first, as they could only be unloaded by workers shoveling out their cargo by hand, a slow and labor-intensive process. A solution for this problem was developed around the 1860s with the drop-bottom gondola, which had hatches installed in the floor which could be opened at a destination, with workers using shovels to direct cargo towards the hatches. This was an improvement over earlier gondolas, but still required manual unloading.

After the American Civil War, advances in technology, especially the development of steel, allowed new and larger gondola designs. Covered gondolas were also developed for cargos that had to be protected from the elements, such as food and freshly made steel. Starting in the 1950s and 1960s, high-sided gondolas were used for coal, thanks to stronger car construction and the invention of rotary car dumpers, which allowed these gondolas to be emptied automatically.

Specialized car types

"Bathtub" gondolas

In the second half of the 20th century, coal haulage shifted from open hopper cars to high-sided gondolas.  Using a gondola, the railroads are able to haul a larger amount of coal per car since gondolas do not include the equipment needed for unloading.  However, since these cars do not have hatches for unloading the products shipped in them, railroads must use rotary car dumpers (mechanisms that hold a car against a short section of track as the car and track are slowly rotated upside down to empty the car) or other means to empty them.  The term "bathtub" refers to the shape of the car.

The "Double Rotary" coal gondola is required in this consist. The "Double Rotary" referring to this car that has rotary couplers on both ends instead of one end.

Coil car 

The coil car is a modified gondola designed specifically for carrying coils of metal.

Track ballast gondolas

Track ballast gondolas carry ballast. These gondolas are side tipping.

Lorry or mine car

An open railroad car (gondola) with a tipping trough, often found in mines.  Known in the UK as a tippler or chaldron wagon and in the US as a mine car.

See also 

 Corf
 Minecart
 Mineral wagon
 Mine railway
 Quarry tub
 Railgon Company
 Well car

References 

Freight rolling stock